Greaterville is a populated place situated in Pima County, Arizona, United States.

References

External links
 Greaterville – ghosttowns.com
 Greaterville – Ghost Town of the Month at azghosttowns.com

Populated places in Pima County, Arizona
Ghost towns in Arizona
Cemeteries in Arizona